In enzymology, a monosaccharide-transporting ATPase is an enzyme that catalyzes the chemical reaction

ATP + H2O + monosaccharideout  ADP + phosphate + monosaccharidein

The 3 substrates of this enzyme are ATP, H2O, and monosaccharide, whereas its 3 products are ADP, phosphate, and monosaccharide.

This enzyme belongs to the family of hydrolases, specifically those acting on acid anhydrides to catalyse transmembrane movement of substances. The systematic name of this enzyme class is ATP phosphohydrolase (monosaccharide-importing). This enzyme participates in abc transporters - general.

Structural studies

As of late 2007, only one structure has been solved for this class of enzymes, with the PDB accession code .

References

 
 
 
 
 
 

EC 3.6.3
Enzymes of known structure